The following radio stations broadcast on FM frequency 103.3 MHz:

Argentina
 LRM75 Universidad in Rosario, Santa Fe
 Play in Posadas, Misiones

Australia
 2GCR in Goulburn, New South Wales
 2KY in Muswellbrook, New South Wales
 2TLP in Taree, New South Wales
 ABC Classic FM in Woomera, South Australia
 Mac FM in Perth, Western Australia
 Radio National in Mount Gambier, South Australia
 Radio TAB in Cooktown, Queensland
 Radio TAB in Mount Isa, Queensland
 Triple J in Darwin, Northern Territory
 Triple J in Roma, Queensland
 Triple J in Wodonga, Victoria

Canada (Channel 277)
 CBOQ-FM in Ottawa, Ontario
 CBZC-FM in Bon Accord, New Brunswick
 CFPF-FM in Banff, Alberta
 CHAA-FM in Longueuil, Quebec
 CHFA-5-FM in Grande Prairie, Alberta
 CJAT-FM-2 in Grand Forks, British Columbia
 CKCI-FM in Sarnia, Ontario
 CKDY-1-FM in Weymouth, Nova Scotia
 CKLP-FM in Parry Sound, Ontario
 CKQV-FM in Vermilion Bay, Ontario
 VF2352 in Granisle, British Columbia
 VOAR-7-FM in Springdale, Newfoundland and Labrador

Chile
 Tele13 Radio in Santiago, Chile

Ireland
 C103 – transmitter for west county Cork

Malaysia
Radio Klasik in North Perak, Padang Rengas, Kuala Kangsar and Central Perak
 ERA in Kota Bharu, Kelantan, Klang Valley, Western Pahang, South Perak and Hilir Perak
 Minnal FM in Kuantan, Pahang, South Terengganu, Malacca and North Johor
 Melody in Johor Bahru, Johor and Singapore

Mexico
 XERFR-FM in Mexico City
 XHAHU-FM in Ciudad Anáhuac, Nuevo León
 XHCPAF-FM in Iguala, Guerrero
 XHCSAA-FM in Manzanillo, Colima
 XHENA-FM in Ensenada, Baja California
 XHFU-FM in Cosamaloapan, Veracruz
 XHIH-FM in Fresnillo, Zacatecas
 XHMAL-FM in Chetumal, Quintana Roo
 XHMICH-FM in Morelia, Michoacán
 XHNAR-FM in Linares, Nuevo León
 XHNW-FM in Culiacán, Sinaloa
 XHPCCC-FM in Ciudad Cuauhtémoc, Chihuahua
 XHRH-FM in Puebla, Puebla
 XHRKS-FM in Reynosa, Tamaulipas
 XHSCBV-FM in San Antonio Castillo Velasco, Oaxaca
 XHSJ-FM in Saltillo, Coahuila
 XHSQ-FM in San Miguel de Allende, Guanajuato
 XHVG-FM in Mexicali, Baja California
 XHVILL-FM in Villahermosa, Tabasco
 XHVJS-FM in Villa Juárez, Sonora
 XHZL-FM in Xalapa, Veracruz

Philippines
 DXJL in Cagayan de Oro City

Sierra Leone
 Capital Radio in Makeni

United Kingdom
 Heart East in Milton Keynes
 London Greek Radio in London
 Oban FM in Scotland
 Imagine Radio in Peak District
 Heart Scotland

United States (Channel 277)
 KATM in Modesto, California
 KAZR in Pella, Iowa
  in Grass Valley, California
 KBEN-FM in Cowley, Wyoming
  in Lake Charles, Louisiana
 KCMU-LP in Napa, California
  in Midland, Texas
  in Falfurrias, Texas
  in Albuquerque, New Mexico
 KDRL (FM) in Pampa, Texas
  in Florence, Montana
  in Idaho Falls, Idaho
 KFUZ-LP in Clarkston, Washington
 KHSM in McKinleyville, California
 KIGG in Igiugig, Alaska
 KIQN in Colorado City, Colorado
  in El Dorado, Arkansas
 KJCS (FM) in Nacogdoches, Texas
  in Hays, Kansas
  in Tulsa, Oklahoma
  in Beaverton, Oregon
  in Orofino, Idaho
  in Saint Louis, Missouri
 KOBV-LP in Bentonville, Arkansas
 KOFP-LP in Fresno, California
 KPCA-LP in Petaluma, California
  in Kansas City, Missouri
  in Delta, Colorado
 KQWF-LP in Wichita Falls, Texas
 KRAN in Warren AFB, Wyoming
 KRUZ in Santa Barbara, California
 KSAG in Pearsall, Texas
  in Santa Clara, California
 KTFC (FM) in Sioux City, Iowa
  in Temecula, California
 KUKI-FM in Ukiah, California
  in Hazelton, North Dakota
 KUVB-LP in Leavenworth, Washington
 KVDT in Allen, Texas
  in Waco, Texas
  in Wilson Creek, Washington
  in Mountain View, Arkansas
 KWPQ-LP in Springfield, Missouri
  in Fergus Falls, Minnesota
 KZCV-LP in Baytown, Texas
  in Seligman, Arizona
 KZNW in Oak Harbor, Washington
  in Lindsay, California
  in Danville, Virginia
  in York, Pennsylvania
  in Santa Claus, Indiana
 WBDB-LP in Richmond, Virginia
 WBGB in Boston, Massachusetts
 WBZL (FM) in Greenwood, Mississippi
  in Cleveland, Ohio
  in Duluth, Minnesota
  in Buffalo, New York
  in Onley-Onancock, Virginia
  in Marquette, Michigan
  in Wisconsin Rapids, Wisconsin
 WGVR-LP in Gainesville, Florida
  in Spring Valley, Illinois
  in Cheraw, South Carolina
  in Asbury, Iowa
  in Nashville, Tennessee
  in Battle Creek, Michigan
 WKMZ in Salem, West Virginia
 WKQL in Brookville, Pennsylvania
  in Lenoir, North Carolina
 WLSE in Canton, Illinois
  in Rockland, Maine
  in Newport, North Carolina
  in Saint Marys, Ohio
  in Montgomery, Alabama
  in Vestal, New York
 WOLT in Indianapolis, Indiana
  in Princeton, New Jersey
 WQGA in Waycross, Georgia
  in Tawas City, Michigan
  in Sharon, Connecticut
 WRQQ in Hammond, Louisiana
 WRTH (FM) in Greer, South Carolina
 WSFM-LP in Asheville, North Carolina
 WSGQ-LP in Columbia, Alabama
 WSHP-LP in Cary, North Carolina
 WSJG-LP in Tiffin, Ohio
 WSPJ-LP in Syracuse, New York
 WTCF in Wardensville, West Virginia
  in Huntington, West Virginia
 WTUS-LP in Tuscaloosa, Alabama
 WVEE in Atlanta, Georgia
  in Caguas, Puerto Rico
  in Holly Hill, Florida
 WWMP in Waterbury, Vermont
 WXCZ in Cedar Key, Florida
 WXOJ-LP in Northampton, Massachusetts
 WXTZ-LP in Yadkinville, North Carolina
  in Georgetown, Kentucky
 WZDF-LP in Merritt Island, Florida
  in Collinsville, Mississippi
 WZND-LP in Bloomington, Illinois

References

Lists of radio stations by frequency